An indirect presidential election was held in the Marshall Islands on 7 January 2008. The parliament elected in November 2007 elected a new president after it formally convened. The opposition coalition elected a new president, Litokwa Tomeing, with a vote of 18 to 15 in favour, beating the incumbent president Kessai Note. A new Speaker from the opposition, Senator Jurelang Zedkaia, was also elected, defeating Senator Alvin Jacklick in another 18–15 vote. Senator Alik Alik from the United Democratic Party (the former government party) was elected as Vice-Speaker with 17 votes against 16 for Kaibuke Kabua.

Tomeing had defected from the United Democratic Party to the opposition United People's Party before the election.

References

2008 elections in Oceania
Presidential election
2008